WDJL (1000 AM, "Gospel Explosions") is a daytime-only radio station licensed to Huntsville, Alabama, that serves the Tennessee Valley and surrounding areas. The station is owned by Dorothy Sandifer (doing business as WDJL Gospel Explosions). The station broadcasts a Christian radio format featuring a mix of gospel music, religious programming, and sermons.

Because WDJL shares the same frequency as "clear channel" station WMVP in Chicago, Illinois, this station only broadcasts during the daytime hours.

Programming
Weekday local programming includes a mixed program of Christian music, Gospel jazz, sermons, teaching programs, and other features. Weekend programming is a mix of gospel music, sermons, and other religious programming.

History
From 1968 until 1979, this frequency was operated as 10,000–watt daytime-only Top 40 station WVOV, whose callsign stood for the "Voice of the Valley." In 1979, the station flipped to a country music format before falling temporarily silent.

In May 1981 the station returned as WTAK, branded as "The New WTAK 10 AM", with an AC format and a morning team of Mike Sweeney and Gary Drake. Limited by the daytime-only restrictions, the station went through several formats and owners; the formats included Oldies, Enerjazz, and AOR/CR.

In 1987 the station changed to a fully fledged AOR format which it later shared with then-sister station  WTAK-FM. After a transition period to establish the FM home of the format, and an April 1994 callsign change to WDJL, the AM station was sold off in 1995.

In October 1996, local insurance and real estate broker Keith Sharp acquired the station as part of a land deal. The station flipped to an oldies music format under the moniker "Gold 1000".

The station ran 10,000 watts of power in a directional pattern until 2006.

The station was purchased by Dorothy Sandifer in 2008. The branding of the station was changed to "WDJL, Gospel Explosions, 1000 AM."

References

External links
 WDJL official website

DJL
Gospel radio stations in the United States
Radio stations established in 1968
1968 establishments in Alabama
DJL
DJL